Trembleya is a genus of flowering plants belonging to the family Melastomataceae.

It is native to Brazil in South America.

Known species
According to Kew:

The genus name of Trembleya is in honour of Abraham Trembley (1710–1784) a Genevan naturalist, Jean Trembley (1704–1785), a Swiss mathematician, and also Jacques-André Trembley (1714–1763), a Swiss botanist.  It was first described and published in Prodr. Vol.3 on page 125 in 1828.

References

Melastomataceae
Melastomataceae genera
Plants described in 1828
Flora of Brazil